Camden Crescent in Bath, Somerset, England, was built by John Eveleigh in 1788; it was originally known as Upper Camden Place. Numbers 6 to 21 have been designated as a Grade I listed buildings. The other houses are Grade II listed.

The houses are of three storeys, with attics and basements. At the southern end of the crescent the basements are at ground level because of the contours of the land. In 1889 a landslide demolished 9 houses at the east end of the crescent. The remains of the houses were demolished and removed to allow Hedgemead Park to be built. This means that the two paired doors of numbers 16 and 17, which stand beneath a pediment supported by five Corinthian columns at what would have been the centre of the crescent, no longer form its middle. The arms of  Charles Pratt, 1st Earl Camden, after whom the crescent was named, are on the doorway keystones along with an elephant's head which was his symbol.

In July 1951 Number 1 Camden Crescent was the scene of an abduction when John Straffen took five-year-old Brenda Goddard and later killed her.

In Jane Austen's Persuasion the Elliot family rent lodgings on Camden Place as the Crescent was then known.

See also

 List of Grade I listed buildings in Bath and North East Somerset

References

Houses completed in 1788
Grade I listed buildings in Bath, Somerset
Streets in Bath, Somerset
Crescents (architecture)
1788 establishments in England